Elmen is a municipality in the district of Reutte in the Austrian state of Tyrol.

Geography
Elmen lies off the main road on the right bank of the Lech.

References

Cities and towns in Reutte District